European Encounter is an album by American pianist and composer John Lewis and Danish violinist Svend Asmussen recorded for the Atlantic label in 1962.

Reception

AllMusic review by Scott Yanow stated: "Asmussen fits in well with Lewis and brings a solid sense of swing to the somewhat complex music".

Track listing
All compositions by John Lewis, except as indicated
 "If I Were Eve" - 5:45
 "Winter Tale" - 5:43
 "Slater's Theme" - 3:33
 "Valeria" - 5:22
 "Lonely Woman" (Ornette Coleman) - 8:13
 "Django" - 3:40
 "New York 19" - 7:28

Personnel 
John Lewis - piano
Svend Asmussen - violin
Jimmy Woode - bass 
Sture Kallin - drums

References 

1962 albums
John Lewis (pianist) albums
Svend Asmussen albums
Atlantic Records albums